The closure of the Suez Canal from November 1956 to April 1957 was caused by Second Arab–Israeli war also known as the Suez Crisis in 1956.  On 26 July 1956 Egyptian president Gamal Abdel Nasser nationalized the Suez Canal from British and French investors that owned the Suez Canal Company, that caused Britain and France to devise a military operation with the help of Israel to invade the Egyptian Sinai Peninsula and have British and French paratroopers drop in to protect the Suez Canal but the objective was to take the canal back. The United States and Soviet Union condemned the invasion and de-escalated the situation by early 1957.

Oil supply through the canal
Around 66% of oil that Europe consumed at the time came through the Suez Canal from mostly Arab States.

Aswen Dam project
The United States was initially going to help fund the Aswan Dam but reneged on their earlier commitment because Egypt was cozying up to Communist influences in the Soviet Union, Czechoslovakia, and recognizing the Chinese Communist Party as the government of China.  Gamal Abdel Nasser nationalized the Suez Canal to get the transit fees from that to help fund the Aswan Dam project.

Egypt blockade of Straits of Tiran

Egypt was blockading the Straits of Tiran to cut off Israel's southern port, Port of Eilat.  That gave Israel motivation to want to invade the Sinai Peninsula during the conflict.

See also
Closure of the Suez Canal (1967–1975)
2021 Suez Canal obstruction
Arab–Israeli conflict
Israeli passage through the Suez Canal and Straits of Tiran
Six-Day War
British Empire

References

Suez Canal
Egypt–United States military relations